A list of windmills in the Dutch province of North Brabant.

 
North Brabant